Anduki Airfield (AKI)  is a domestic airfield which now primarily operates as a heliport, located in Seria, a town in the Belait District of Brunei Darussalam.  It is operated by Brunei Shell Petroleum (BSP), and uses Sikorsky S-92 and AgustaWestland AW139 helicopters in support of servicing offshore oil platforms.  Brunei Shell Petroleum replaced the original grass airstrip with a sealed instrument runway in 2008.  Future upgrades include the addition of runway lighting, and an enhanced instrument approach procedure.  Operations at Anduki Airfield are carried out in accordance with regulations from the United Kingdom Civil Aviation Authority (CAA) and the European Union Aviation Safety Agency (EASA) standards.

History
The airport was opened in 1951, after a Supermarine Sea Otter owned by British Malaysian Petroleum was the first aeroplane to land at the Anduki Aerodrome in 1949.  In 1955, Malaysian Airways used a de Havilland Dragon Rapide to charter from Brunei Town, Anduki Airfield, Miri, and Labuan.  Moreover, the first Brunei Shell Petroleum (BSP) helicopter, a Sikorsky S-55 loaned from Worldwide Helicopters, came into service.

The Queen's Own Highlanders, in support of the joint effort to suppress the Brunei revolt, boarded five Twin Pioneers and a Blackburn Beverley which landed at Anduki in 1962.  In 1964, the Sikorsky S-61N came into service together as Brunei Shell Petroleum Aviation Services Department (SAV) formed.  A few years later in 1966, SAV purchased three more S-61Ns.

In 1999, the Department of Civil Aviation (DCA) issue a commercial air operations certificate to SAV.  The Sikorsky S-92 was introduced in 2005 to replace older aircraft.

On 14 May 2013, Sikorsky Aerospace Services announced plans for the conversion of BSP's Sikorsky S-92 into search and rescue (SAR) modifications, this became operational in 2014.  On 17 June 2013, two AgustaWestland AW139 were delivered to BSP after the contract was awarded six months earlier.  On 18 April 2017, Sikorsky recognised BSP for 50 years of service since the mid-1950s with five Sikorsky S-55, in which is the first product from the company to be used.  On 27 May 2019, a milestone was set by Siti Saffawana for being the first Bruneian Commander of the BSP Search and Rescue Department.

Notable aircraft
Some aircraft which have been used or present on this airfield:

Gallery

References

External links

Short history of Brunei aviation — contains history and photos of Anduki Airfield
Ministry of Transport and Infocommunications (MTIC), Brunei Darussalam — at GOV.BN
Ministry of Transport and Infocommunications (MTIC) – directory — parent to the Department of Civil Aviation (DCA), at GOV.BN
SkyVector aviation chart for Anduki Airfield

Airports in Brunei
Belait District
1951 establishments in Brunei